Nemici d'infanzia is a 1995 Italian comedy-drama film written by Luigi Magni and Carla Vistarini and directed by Luigi Magni. The film won the David di Donatello for Best Script.

Cast 
Renato Carpentieri: Corsini
Paolo Murano: Paolo
Giorgia Tartaglia: Luciana
Nicola Russo: Marco

References

External links

1995 films
Italian comedy-drama films
Films directed by Luigi Magni
1995 comedy-drama films
Films scored by Nicola Piovani
1990s Italian films